Kurt Elias (born 1 April 1928) was an Austrian wrestler. He competed in the men's Greco-Roman bantamweight at the 1948 Summer Olympics.

References

External links
 

1928 births
Possibly living people
Austrian male sport wrestlers
Olympic wrestlers of Austria
Wrestlers at the 1948 Summer Olympics
Place of birth missing